WXGO (1270 AM) is a radio station broadcasting a classic hits format. Licensed to Madison, Indiana, United States, the station serves the Louisville area. The station is currently owned by Dubois County Broadcasting, Inc. and features programming from Westwood One and the Cincinnati Reds.

Translator

EKU presently operates onelow-power FM translator stations.

References

External links

XGO
Classic hits radio stations in the United States
Radio stations established in 1956